The 2017–18 season of the Frauen-Bundesliga was the 28th season of Germany's premier women's football league. It ran from 2 September 2017 to 3 June 2018.

The fixtures were published on 10 July 2017.

VfL Wolfsburg won their second straight and fourth overall title.

Teams

Team changes

Stadiums

League table

Results

Topscorers

References

External links
Weltfussball.de
DFB.de

2017-18
2017–18 in German women's football leagues